The 2015 Nigerian Senate election in Abia State was held on March 28, 2015, to elect members of the Nigerian Senate to represent Abia State. Theodore Orji representing Abia Central, Enyinnaya Abaribe representing Abia South and Mao Ohuabunwa representing Abia North all won on the platform of All Progressives Congress.

Overview

Summary

Results

Abia Central 
People's Democratic Party (Nigeria) candidate Theodore Orji won the election, defeating All Progressives Congress candidate Iheanacho Obioma and other party candidates.

Abia South 
People's Democratic Party (Nigeria) candidate Enyinnaya Abaribe won the election, defeating All Progressives Congress candidate Chinonyerem Macebuh and other party candidates.

Abia North 
People's Democratic Party (Nigeria) candidate Mao Ohuabunwa won the election, defeating All Progressives Congress candidate Nnennaya Lancaster-Okoro and other party candidates.

References 

March 2015 events in Nigeria
Abia State Senate elections
2015 Nigerian Senate elections